Henry Hardie may refer to:

Henry Hardie, see North Carolina 1861 5 cents banknote
Henry P. Hardie, see List of mayors of Anderson, Indiana 
Henry G. Hardie, see Sailing at the 1948 Summer Olympics – 6 metre class

See also
Henry Hardy (disambiguation)